Ynysawdre Comprehensive School was a public secondary school located in Tondu in Bridgend County Borough which catered for ages between 11 and 18.

Beginning in Autumn Term 2011, Ynysawdre Comprehensive officially closed and its former students merged with those of Ogmore School to become Coleg Cymunedol Y Dderwen (translated to The Oak Community College).

Merge with "Ogmore" 2011 

As part of a new multi-million project, the school merged with neighbouring school 'Ogmore Comprehensive School' to become Coleg Cymunedol Y Dderwen which opened in September 2011. Both schools continued to see the number of pupils enrolling every year continue to drop, prompting firstly, the council to consider closing one of the 2 schools. However, in 2010, Bridgend County Borough Council, passed a vote and decided to merge the two schools, coming into effect in September 2011. "Ynysawdre Comprehensive School" officially had its last day of service on 21 July 2011, with the school itself, pupils and staff, past and present, holding an open day on the 19th.

The new school currently operates on a split-site basis during a two-year transitional period, while the new main building will be built upon the Ynysawdre site. The new building is expected to be up and running in September 2013. After that, it remains unclear as to what will happen to the "Ogmore" building, with many rumours pointing towards the land being used for a new housing estate.

In 2014, it was revealed that I.T. teacher, Mcphallen Kuwale, was convicted of dealing illegal substances such as cocaine.

Uniform
Original Ynysawdre Comprehensive School Uniform

Rugby jersey - Bright red with white collar with two thin central black hoops

School Uniform (later)

References

External links 

Official Website

Defunct schools in Bridgend County Borough
Educational institutions established in 1964
1964 establishments in Wales
Educational institutions disestablished in 2011
2011 disestablishments in Wales